Carya palmeri, the Mexican hickory, is a tree species native to Mexico. It was first described by Wayne Eyer Manning. Carya palmeri is part of the genus Carya, and the family Juglandaceae.

Range
Carya palmeri is endemic to Mexico and is found in the mountains of Nuevo León, Tamaulipas, and Vera Cruz It also occurs in San Luis Potosí. The tree grows on steep slopes, often in association with Carya myristiciformis.

References

palmeri